The 1973 Football League Cup Final was held on 3 March 1973 and was won by Tottenham Hotspur. Spurs beat Norwich City 1–0 at the old Wembley.

Match

Summary
The only goal of the game was scored by substitute Ralph Coates in the 72nd minute with a low right foot shot to the left corner of the net from just outside the penalty area.

Details

Road to Wembley
Home teams listed first.

References

External links
Match summary on Soccerbase

EFL Cup Finals
League Cup Final 1973
League Cup Final 1973
1972–73 Football League
Football League Cup Final
Football League Cup Final